Mahvelat County is in Razavi Khorasan province, Iran. The capital of the county is the city of Feyzabad. At the 2006 census, the county's population was 47,068 in 12,268 households. The following census in 2011 counted 48,900 people in 14,226 households. At the 2016 census, the county's population was 51,409 in 15,844 households.

Administrative divisions

The population history and structural changes of Mahvelat County's administrative divisions over three consecutive censuses are shown in the following table. The latest census shows two districts, four rural districts, and two cities.

References

 

Counties of Razavi Khorasan Province